Children of a Lesser God may refer to:

 Children of a Lesser God (play), a 1979 play by Mark Medoff
 Children of a Lesser God (film), a 1986 American film
 Children of a Lesser God (album), a 2010 album by Wisemen
 Children of a Lesser God (TV series), a 2018 South Korean television series